Menzies is a suburb in the City of Mount Isa, Queensland, Australia.

Geography 
The Leichhard River flows north–south through the town of Mount Isa, dividing the suburbs of the town into "mineside" (west of the Leichhardt River) and "townside" (east of the Leichhardt River). Menzies is a "townside" suburb.

History 
Menzies was named by the Queensland Place Names Board on 1 September 1973.  On 16 March 2001 the status of Menzies was changed from a locality to a suburb.

St Kieran's Christian Brothers College opened on 25 January 1960  with an initial enrolment of 132 boys in Years 4 to 7 with Brother Tom Higgins as the first principal. By 1967 the school had an enrolment of over 300 boys in Years 4 to 10. Increasing enrolments put pressure on the classroom space and in 1970 the school ceased to offer Year 4 (as that was available at St Joseph's Catholic Primary School at Parkside). The school closed on 7 December 1984 as part of a rationalisation and amalgamation of the various Catholic schools in Mount Isa, resulting in Mount Isa Catholic High School (a merger of St Kieran's secondary school with the girls' secondary San Jose College) occupying the former St Kieran's site in Menzies. St Kieran's Catholic Primary School was then opened at a new site in Pioneer. On 20 May 2005 Mount Isa Catholic High School was renamed as Good Shepherd Catholic College.

Education 
Good Shepherd Catholic College is a Catholic secondary (7-12) school for boys and girls at the corner of Mary and Camooweal Streets. In 2017, the school had an enrolment of 489 students with 42 teachers and 25 non-teaching staff (22 full-time equivalent).

Reference 

City of Mount Isa
Suburbs in Queensland